Saanvi Talwar is an Indian actress who mainly works in Hindi television. She made her acting debut with Arjun portraying Neha Joseph in 2013. She is best known for her portrayal of Natasha in O Gujariya, Maanvi Chatterjee Sabharwal in Yeh Kahan Aa Gaye Hum and Durdhara in Chandra Nandini.

Talwar made her film debut with the Hindi film Gabbar Is Back in 2015.

Career

Debut and success (2013-2017)
Talwar started her career as a writer and has written many episodes for the television series Fear Files: Darr Ki Sacchi Tasvirein, CID and SuperCops vs Supervillains.

started her acting career in 2013 as she played Nia in episode 34 of the Star Plus series Arjun. In 2014, she portrayed the role of Natasha in Channel V's O Gujariya: Badlein Chal Duniya. In 2015, she appeared as Nazia Raza Ibrahim in Zee TV's Qubool Hai.

Saanvi Talwar achieved limelight when she played the role of Manvi Chatterjee in &TV's Yeh Kahan Aa Gaye Hum opposite Karan Kundra from 2015 to 2016. Next, she signed to play Chandragupta Maurya's wife Durdhara in Star Plus series Chandra Nandini in 2017.

Recent work (2018-present)
In 2018 she was seen in a cameo in Vikram Betaal Ki Rahasya Gatha. A year later, Talwar played Rupali, an antagonist in Star Bharat's Sufiyana Pyaar Mera.

Talwar has been featured in many episodic stories as a main protagonist like CID, Crime Petrol, Savdhaan India : India Fights Back, Aahat , Fear Files : Darr Ki Sacchi Tasvirein, Adaalat , Love on the Run mtv, Haunted Nights, Ishq Kills , Zindagi Ke Crossroads and SuperCops vs Supervillains .

Filmography

Films

Television

References

External links
 

Living people
Indian television actresses
Actresses from Mumbai
Actresses in Hindi television
Year of birth missing (living people)